Nepomnyashchiy is a male Russian surname that has a large number of transliterations. Its feminine counterpart is Nepomnyashchaya. It may refer to
 Aleksandr Nepomnyashchiy (1968–2007), Russian poet and singer
 Aleksey Nepomniaschiy (born 1980), Russian and Ukrainian journalist
 Alex Nepomniaschy, American cinematographer
 Ian Nepomniachtchi (born 1990), Russian chess grandmaster
 Valery Nepomnyashchy (born 1943) Russian association football player and manager 

Surnames of Russian origin